Helen Nicholson is a New Zealand medical academic specialising in male reproductive health. She is a full professor and Deputy Vice-Chancellor (Academic) at the University of Otago.

Academic career
After a 1986 MD from the University of Bristol, Nicholson worked at that institution before moving to the University of Otago as full professor in 2000. Before becoming Deputy Vice-Chancellor, she previously held positions as the head of the Department of Anatomy, Dean of the School of Medical Sciences, and Pro Vice-Chancellor (International).

Nicholson's speciality is male reproductive health, including prostate health. She also holds administrative roles and international outreach roles at a national and international level.

A 2016 study on medical students operating on themselves and each other gained international attention.

Selected works 
 Nicholson, Helen D., R. W. Swann, G. D. Burford, D. Claire Wathes, D. G. Porter, and B. T. Pickering. "Identification of oxytocin and vasopressin in the testis and in adrenal tissue." Regulatory peptides 8, no. 2 (1984): 141–146.
 Thackare, Hemlata, Helen D. Nicholson, and Kate Whittington. "Oxytocin—its role in male reproduction and new potential therapeutic uses." Human Reproduction Update 12, no. 4 (2006): 437–448.
 Frayne, J., and H. D. Nicholson. "Localization of oxytocin receptors in the human and macaque monkey male reproductive tracts: evidence for a physiological role of oxytocin in the male." Molecular human reproduction 4, no. 6 (1998): 527–532.
 Frayne, Janet, and Helen D. Nicholson. "Effect of oxytocin on testosterone production by isolated rat Leydig cells is mediated via a specific oxytocin receptor." Biology of Reproduction 52, no. 6 (1995): 1268–1273.

References

Living people
New Zealand women academics
Year of birth missing (living people)
Alumni of the University of Bristol
Academic staff of the University of Otago
New Zealand medical researchers